Cult Cargo: Belize City Boil Up is the sixth release by The Numero Group. The release documents Compton Fairweather's circle of musical influence in the tiny nation of Belize.

Track listing 

 "Disco Connection" - Lord Rhaburn
 "Can't Go Halfway" - Harmonettes
 "Guajida" - Jesus Acosta & The Professionals
 "The Same Old Me" - The Web
 "A Part of Being with You" - The Professionals
 "More Love Reggae" - Lord Rhaburn
 "The Back Stabbers" - The Professionals
 "Rated G" - The Web
 "Shame Shame Shame" - Harmonettes
 "Funky Jive Part II" - Soul Creations
 "Don't Fight It" - Lord Rhaburn
 "Long Time Boy" - Nadia Cattouse
 "Boogaloo a La Chuck" - Lord Rhaburn
 "Theme from the Godfather" - The Professionals
 "Things Are Going to Work Out Right" - The Web
 "Funky Jive Part I" - Soul Creations

References

External links 
 http://www.dustedmagazine.com/reviews/2431
 http://numerogroup.com/products/cult-cargo-belize-city-boil-up

2005 compilation albums
The Numero Group compilation albums